Max Payne is a video game series.

Max Payne may also refer to:

Max Payne (video game), first video game of the series
Max Payne (character), character from the video game series
Max Payne (film), 2008 film based on the video game series
Max Payne (racing driver) (born 1940), British former racing driver
Maxx Payne (born 1961), American musician, actor and former professional wrestler
Max Landon Payne (1970–2009), American convicted murderer